Do What You Wanna Do is the fifth studio album by the Masters Apprentices, released in November 1988 on Virgin Records. It was the group's first album in 17 years since A Toast To Panama Red.

Background
In the early 1980s there was a revival of interest in the Masters Apprentices due partly to rock historian Glenn A. Baker, who featured the band for his Rock & Roll Trivia Show on Sydney radio's Triple J, which in turn led to the release of a definitive compilation LP, Hands of Time by Baker's Raven Records in 1981. The classic Burgess, Ford, Keays and Wheatley line-up reformed in August 1987 for a "Back to the 1960s" special on the popular TV variety show Hey Hey It's Saturday. It marked the first time all four had played together since Wheatley had left in late 1971. They undertook a reunion tour during 1988 and released an album, Do What You Wanna Do, featuring new material and new versions of their earlier songs.

Content
The album's first side contains new recordings of original material and two re-recordings of "Turn Up Your Radio" and "Because I Love You" (the band's most popular songs). "Because I Love You" also gained new prominence around that time via its use in a series of advertisements for a well-known brand of jeans; the revamped version of "Because I Love You" peaked at No. 30 on the ARIA Charts. Its Side B is live recordings taken from the 1988 reunion tour.

Track listing
All songs written by Doug Ford and Jim Keays, except where noted.

Personnel 

The Masters Apprentices
 Doug Ford  - acoustic guitar, electric guitar, vocals
 Jim Keays  - vocals, harmonica
 Colin Burgess  - drums, percussion
 Glenn Wheatley  - bass
 Gavin Webb  - bass on live recordings

Other musicians
 Massive Appendages  - backing vocals
 Adrian McNeil  - sarod
 Joe Camilleri  - saxophone

Production team
 Producer  - Peter Blyton
 Engineers (studio)  - Adam Quaife, Angus Davidson
 Engineers (live)  - Ernie Rose
 Assistant engineer  - Tony Salter
 Mastering energineer  - Alan Parsons

Artwork
 Millennium  - artwork

References 

General
  Note: limited preview for on-line version.
 
  Note: Archived [on-line] copy has limited functionality.
  Note: [on-line] version was established at White Room Electronic Publishing Pty Ltd in 2007 and was expanded from the 2002 edition. As from September 2010 the [on-line] version is no longer available.

Specific

1988 albums
The Masters Apprentices albums